Joseph-Émile Perron (October 26, 1893 – December 19, 1979) was a Canadian provincial politician. He was the Union Nationale member of the Legislative Assembly of Quebec for Beauce from 1937 to 1939. He was also mayor of East Broughton Station from 1937 to 1939. He served in the Canadian Expeditionary Force during World War I and was awarded the Croix de Guerre. father of the Canadian scenarist Clément Perron.</ref> family member

References

1893 births
1979 deaths
Canadian Expeditionary Force soldiers
Mayors of places in Quebec
People from Chaudière-Appalaches
Recipients of the Croix de Guerre 1914–1918 (France)
Union Nationale (Quebec) MNAs